The Cult of Skaro were an elite order of Daleks in the British science fiction television series Doctor Who. They first appeared in the two part episode "Army of Ghosts" / "Doomsday".

Background
The Cult of Skaro first appeared in the double-episode "Army of Ghosts" / "Doomsday". They are described as an elite organisation created by the Emperor of the Daleks to think as their enemies think and find new ways of surviving – and killing enemies. Their creative task extended to them developing imaginations and taking on individual names: Dalek Sec, Dalek Thay, Dalek Caan and Dalek Jast. According to the Doctor Who Files book on the Cult of Skaro, the members of the cult were commanders of different sections of the Dalek army, before being selected and promoted by the Dalek Emperor. In their task they even outrank the Emperor but still revere him; however, by the time of their first on-screen appearance they have survived the demise of the Emperor (in "The Parting of the Ways") .

The Cult of Skaro escaped the end of the Time War in a void ship along with a captured Time Lord prison ship containing millions of Daleks, which they call the Genesis Ark. In the episode "Doomsday", it is explained that the Genesis Ark can only be opened by the touch of a time-traveller and The Doctor and Rose Tyler both refuse, but Mickey Smith accidentally touches it, releasing the Daleks. The Doctor ultimately manages to use the vortex manipulator at the Torchwood Institute to suck what he believes to be all the Daleks back into the Void.

Unknown to the Doctor, the four members of the Cult managed to initiate an emergency temporal shift and ended up in 1930s New York City. In "Daleks in Manhattan", operating from a laboratory underneath the Empire State Building, the Cult use "Pig-slaves" to capture people for their experiments. As the last of their race, the Cult's situation became desperate, with Thay sacrificing his rear casing for construction of a mast at the top of the building. Sec questioned the genetic superiority of the Dalek race, and proposed the evolution into Hybrid Daleks, which he hoped would combine the best traits of both humans and Daleks. In "Evolution of the Daleks", Sec, who had transformed into a "human Dalek", was removed from command by Caan and eventually killed by Thay. The Dalek Humans, tainted by Time Lord DNA due to the Doctor's interference with Thay's aforementioned casing,  turned on the Cult, killing both Thay and Jast. Caan escaped a confrontation with the Doctor by another emergency temporal shift.

In the 2008 episode "The Stolen Earth", it is revealed that Caan travelled to the first year of the Time War, despite it being time-locked. Doing so forced Caan to stare into the depths of the Time Vortex and thus cost him his sanity, but it also showed him the course of the future. Whilst in the Time War, Caan rescued Davros from the wreckage of his command ship, allowing Davros to return to the present day and create a new Dalek Empire with his DNA. Davros holds Caan in very high esteem, although the new Daleks believe Caan to be an "abomination" due to his insanity and his possession of emotions.

When he passed through time and space to rescue Davros, Caan saw the carnage caused by the Dalek race and was disgusted by it. In "Journey's End", Caan convinced the Meta-Crisis Doctor to destroy the Daleks and end their reign of terror, having himself facilitated the events that led to the creation of the Meta-Crisis Doctor and the DoctorDonna. Caan, the last of the quartet, was presumably killed when the Dalek command ship, the Crucible, exploded.

Markings
Aside from their voices and Sec's unique colouring scheme, each Dalek in the cult has a specific marking on their casing to set them apart from the others. Underneath their eyepiece, there is a marking consisting of a rectangle connected to a small square by a line on its right side. Within the rectangle are three small horizontal lines arranged vertically on the left side. To distinguish one Dalek from another, one of these three lines is extended, or none at all in the case of Sec. Jast has his line at the top, Caan in the middle, and Thay at the bottom.

Members

Dalek Sec

Dalek Sec was the leader of the cult and of the Dalek attack during the Battle of Canary Wharf against the Cybermen. His original casing was completely black instead of the golden colour traditional Daleks had. He showed his leadership by communicating to the enemy, namely, Rose Tyler, Cybermen and The Doctor, and commanding the other three Daleks. Because there were only four Daleks outside the void, Sec fought alongside the other Cult members against the enemy, and kept checking the status of the Genesis Ark. However, as soon as the Ark was 'primed' Sec escaped the Torchwood tower with the Ark, to command the entire army of Daleks from the sky whilst keeping a close watch on the Ark. Because the Cyberman Army and the Void Ship containing the Cult, the Genesis Ark, and the Dalek Army within had travelled through the void, they had all picked up 'void stuff' which, when the Doctor reversed the flow of the radiation, sucked both armies, the Genesis Ark and the Void Ship back into the Void. Dalek Sec and the Cult were able to escape the slaughter by initiating an Emergency Temporal Shift.

Along with the rest of the Cult of Skaro, he ended up in New York in 1930 and established a base beneath the Empire State Building. Taking control of the Empire State construction and forcibly converting humans into "pig slaves" to serve as a labour force, the Cult of Skaro also worked on experiments designed to evolve Dalek-kind into a new form.  The Cult recruited the power-hungry human servant Mr. Diagoras, who seemed to think more like a Dalek than most, which Dalek Caan admitted. Sec turned against the concept of Dalek genetic purity, viewing survival as more important and seeing human DNA as holding useful attributes, as the humans thrive as a species whereas the Daleks had become nearly extinct. Using himself and Mr Diagoras as the test for the Final Experiment, he was transformed into the first Hybrid Dalek.

While in his new body, he began to feel humanity for the first time in his existence. He was being motivated by emotions rather than the traditional Dalek drive to conquer, saying that Davros, the Dalek's creator was wrong. Motivated by this, Sec asked the Doctor to help him create more hybrids using human bodies. In opposition to the views of Davros, their creator, he decided that the Daleks would have to evolve to survive or eventually die out. When the Doctor said Earth had no room for another race, Sec said the Doctor could use the TARDIS to take the new race to another world. Sec was upset at the death of the Hooverville Leader Solomon, who tried to make peace with the Daleks. However, the other three Daleks came to reject Sec's theories, eventually deposing Sec and putting him in chains. Dalek Caan took control and fuelled the other human bodies with pure Dalek DNA. Sec opposed their attempt to kill the Doctor, warning the others that "If you choose death and destruction... then death and destruction will choose you." The Daleks dismissed this thought, arguing that they "always survive", and killed their former leader when he tried to protect the Doctor. The Doctor showed his respect for Sec by calling him the "cleverest Dalek ever" and the only one who could have led the Daleks "from the darkness."

Due to his hybridization from Dalek to Human Dalek, Dalek Sec has been the first Dalek to repent the deaths he caused (Dalek Caan being the second), and the only Dalek who willingly sacrificed himself to save the Doctor.

His character as a Dalek/Human hybrid is not entirely clear, as, although he eventually feels humanity, it is sometimes also implied that he still had plans to cause destruction. An example would be when Dalek Caan becomes 'controller' of the Human Daleks and plugged into their military computer; Sec responds to this act of treachery with "That was to be my position!"

Sec was the first Dalek of the new series to have its mutant seen while in a healthy state (with a possible exception of the Dalek Emperor). He was also the first Dalek in the new series to open its lower casing as well, showing longer tentacles. Sec was also shown to be able to engulf Mr. Diagoras in a sack-like membrane projected from what appears to be his mouth parts.
His "skin" had a dark-greenish color to it as well.

According to the Doctor Who Files book on the Cult Of Skaro, Dalek Sec was the Commander of the Seventh Incursion Squad and led the attack on the Mechonoids on Magella before being promoted by the Dalek Emperor.

Dalek Caan 

Dalek Caan was originally second in command to Dalek Sec, whom he overthrew after Sec became a Human/Dalek hybrid.  He has the lowest pitched voice in the Cult, and is the most prominent Dalek of the revived series (having appeared in a total of six episodes).

According to the Doctor Who Files book on the Cult of Skaro, Caan was once an Attack Squad Leader in the Thirteenth Assault Group before being promoted by the Emperor.

He fought in the Battle of Canary Wharf, but his role in "Doomsday" was minor. He escaped with the rest of the Cult. In "Daleks in Manhattan" and "Evolution of the Daleks" when the Cult arrived in 1930s Manhattan, Caan had a far more significant role, taking over the group. He oversaw the construction of the Empire State Building, delivering orders from Sec to Mr. Diagoras, and acted as the Cult's contact on the surface. After Sec's transformation into a Human Dalek, Caan and Jast began to doubt their leader's motives. When Sec decided to give the Human-Daleks emotions, Caan intervened, altering the process to make them 100% Dalek. Caan overthrew Sec and took command of the Cult. After the Tenth Doctor spliced his own DNA into the Human-Daleks, Caan destroyed the hybrid species.

Dalek Caan reappears in "The Stolen Earth". An emergency temporal shift used to escape from the Doctor had him go through a series of times. He broke the time lock and arrived during the Time War, allowing him to rescue Davros, the creator of the Daleks. He witnessed  "all of time", effectively becoming precognitive. Most of his prophecies are doggerel, and require careful interpretation. He appears to become sinisterly more lucid as his plans come to fruition, however.

In "The Stolen Earth", the Supreme Dalek refers to Caan as 'The Abomination'.

Dalek Caan is one of very few Daleks to realise – in his case through his witnessing the actions of all Daleks throughout time – that the Dalek way of existing is destructive and intolerable. He fulfills the prediction Dalek Sec made before he was killed, by manipulating events throughout time to cause the new Daleks made by Davros to be destroyed. He himself claims that he only helped, and that the events which occurred were fated anyway.

Dalek Thay

Dalek Thay was the first to be named on screen. He was third in command to Sec. He initiated Dalek hostilities on the invading Cybermen army after killing two of them in "Doomsday". Thay fought in the Battle of Canary Wharf and "temporally shifted" along with the other members of the Cult of Skaro when the Doctor reopened the Void.

Like the other regular Dalek members of the Cult, he had doubts about Dalek Sec's plan to merge with a human as part of Sec's vision of Dalek "evolution". He sacrificed three panels of his skirt to create the lightning conductor of the Empire State Building, and also served as the Cult's contact to Mr. Diagoras. In the climax of "Evolution of the Daleks", Thay dismisses the warnings of the Hybrid Dalek Sec and kills him. Moments later, Thay was destroyed (along with Dalek Jast) when the Dalek Human hybrids rebelled against the orders to kill the Doctor and opened fire on the Daleks instead.

According to the Doctor Who Files book on the Cult of Skaro, Dalek Thay was the Commandant of Station Alpha, the most secret Dalek research facility, before being promoted by the Dalek Emperor.

Dalek Jast

Dalek Jast oversaw the status of the Genesis Ark in "Doomsday". He fought in the Battle of Canary Wharf and escaped the void with his comrades. He was the fourth in command of the cult.

Jast and Thay assisted Sec in experiments underneath the Empire State Building. When Sec was about to merge with Mr Diagoras and become the first Human Dalek, he and Thay intervened with Sec's experiment in order to maintain Dalek purity, but Sec retorted that their road for supremacy has brought the Daleks to extinction. Jast continued to question Sec's motives, and eventually betrayed him along with Thay and Caan. He was destroyed by the Dalek humans along with Dalek Thay by the weapons of the human Daleks.

Dalek Jast had the highest-pitched voice in the Cult. He was the third member to be killed, shortly after Thay.

According to the Doctor Who Files book on the Cult of Skaro, Dalek Jast was Force Leader of the Outer Rim Defensive Battalion before being promoted by the Dalek Emperor.

See also
Dalek
Dalek variants
History of the Daleks

References

Extraterrestrial supervillains
Daleks
Fictional mutants
Fictional cults
Fictional mass murderers
Fictional prophets
Recurring characters in Doctor Who
Fictional kidnappers
Fictional war criminals